Cheyenne Autumn is a 1953 non-fiction book by Mari Sandoz. It is about the Northern Cheyenne Exodus, an attempt by the Northern Cheyenne to repatriate themselves to their homeland in and around present-day Yellowstone National Park.

References

1953 books
Books by Mari Sandoz